Utsetela is a genus of flowering plants belonging to the family Moraceae.

Its native range is Democratic Republic of the Congo, Gabon and Republic of the Congo.

Species:
 Utsetela gabonensis Pellegr. 
 Utsetela neglecta Jongkind

References

Moraceae
Moraceae genera